Thomas Lisieux (died 1456) was a Canon of Windsor from 1435 to 1442 and Dean of St Paul’s from 1441 to 1456.

Career
He was appointed:
Senior Proctor, Oxford 1426 
Rector of St Michael, Cornhill 1433 - 1447
Prebendary of Rugmere in St Paul’s Cathedral 1436 - 1452
Prebendary of Totenhall in St Paul’s Cathedral 1452 - 1456
Dean of St Paul’s 1441 - 1456
Prebendary of Henfield in Chichester Cathedral 1443
Treasurer of the collegiate church of Abergelly, St David’s.
Prebendary of Church of St. Mary Magdalene, Bridgnorth 
Keeper of the Privy Seal 1450 – 1456 

He was appointed to the twelfth stall in St George's Chapel, Windsor Castle in 1435, and held the stall until 1442.

Notes 

1456 deaths
Canons of Windsor
Deans of St Paul's
Year of birth missing
Lords Privy Seal